Otto Herman Max Brandenburg (4 September 1934 – 1 March 2007) was a Danish musician, singer and actor.

Career

Music and Theatre 
He debuted in 1955 in the ensemble Four Jacks, but quickly became a soloist producing Danish rock. He then adapted his pop songs to folk music and jazz and became a popular actor. Brandenburg released records in Sweden and Germany under the name "Ole Brandenburg". In 1960, he unsuccessfully participated in the Dansk Melodi Grand Prix with the song "To Lys På Et Bord" (two lights on one board). In 1969, he began a new musical direction, setting his own lyrics to an American melody in the Christmas song "Søren Banjomus."

In the 1970s he often worked with actress Vivi Bak. In the 1980s he collaborated with songwriters Halfdan Rasmussen and Evert Taube.

Film 

Brandenburgs last job was voicing "Hanbjørnen" in the animated movie "Drengen der ville gøre det umulige" which released in 2002

Brandenburg sang "You've Got a Friend in Me" in the Danish dub of Toy Story.

Filmography 

 Styrmand Karlsen (1958)
 Sømand i knibe (1960)
 Mine tossede drenge (1961)
  (1962)
 Don Olsen kommer til byen (1964)
  (1969)
 Guld til præriens skrappe drenge (1971)
 Bennys badekar (1971)
  (1971)
  (1971)
 Med kærlig hilsen (1971)
  (1972)
 Man sku' være noget ved musikken (1972)
 Lenin, din gavtyv (1972)
 Mig og Mafiaen (1973)
  (1974)
  (1974)
  (1975)
 Familien Gyldenkål (1975)
 Piger i trøjen (1975)
  (1976)
 Spøgelsestoget (1976)
  (1976)
  (1976)
 Strømer (1976)
 Julefrokosten (1976)
  (1977)
  (1977)
 Pas på ryggen, professor (1977)
  (1978)
 Mig og Charly (1978)
 Trællene (1978)
  (1979)
  (1979)
 Next Stop Paradise (1980)
  (1981)
  (1981)
  (1981)
  (1982)
  (1982)
  (1982)
  (1986)
  (1988)
  (1989)
 Sort høst (1993)
 Riget I (1994)
 Riget II (1997)
  (1998)
 Du Skal Bruge Dit Liv (1999)
  (2000)
 Prop og Berta (2000)
 Max (2000)

References

External links 
 

1934 births
2007 deaths
20th-century Danish male singers
Best Actor Bodil Award winners
Danish film score composers
Danish male film actors
Male film score composers
People from Billund Municipality
Best Supporting Actor Bodil Award winners